A theoretical motivation for general relativity, including the motivation for the geodesic equation and the Einstein field equation, can be obtained from special relativity by examining the dynamics of particles in circular orbits about the earth. A key advantage in examining circular orbits is that it is possible to know the solution of the Einstein Field Equation a priori. This provides a means to inform and verify the formalism.

General relativity addresses two questions:
 How does the curvature of spacetime affect the motion of matter?
 How does the presence of matter affect the curvature of spacetime?

The former question is answered with the geodesic equation. The second question is answered with the Einstein field equation. The geodesic equation and the field equation are related through a principle of least action. The motivation for the geodesic equation is provided in the section Geodesic equation for circular orbits. The motivation for the Einstein field equation is provided in the section Stress–energy tensor.



Geodesic equation for circular orbits

Kinetics of circular orbits

For definiteness consider a circular earth orbit (helical world line) of a particle. The particle travels with speed v. An observer on earth sees that length is contracted in the frame of the particle. A measuring stick traveling with the particle appears shorter to the earth observer. Therefore, the circumference of the orbit, which is in the direction of motion appears longer than  times the diameter of the orbit.

In special relativity the 4-proper-velocity of the particle in the inertial (non-accelerating) frame of the earth is

.

The magnitude of the 4-velocity vector is always constant

where we are using a Minkowski metric

.

The magnitude of the 4-velocity is therefore a Lorentz scalar.

The 4-acceleration in the earth (non-accelerating) frame is

where  is c times the proper time interval measured in the frame of the particle. This is related to the time interval in the Earth's frame by

.

Here, the 3-acceleration for a circular orbit is

The magnitude of the 4-velocity is constant. This implies that the 4-acceleration must be perpendicular to the 4-velocity. The inner product of the 4-acceleration and the 4-velocity is therefore always zero. The inner product is a Lorentz scalar.

Curvature of spacetime: Geodesic equation
The equation for the acceleration can be generalized, yielding the geodesic equation

where  is the Kronecker delta function, and we have the constraints

and

.

It is easily verified that circular orbits satisfy the geodesic equation. The geodesic equation is actually more general. Circular orbits are a particular solution of the equation. Solutions other than circular orbits are permissible and valid.

Ricci curvature tensor and trace

The Ricci curvature tensor is a special curvature tensor given by the contraction

.

The trace of the Ricci tensor, called the scalar curvature, is

.

The geodesic equation in a local coordinate system

Consider the situation in which there are now two particles in nearby circular polar orbits of the earth at radius  and speed .

The particles execute simple harmonic motion about the earth and with respect to each other. They are at their maximum distance from each other as they cross the equator. Their trajectories intersect at the poles.

Imagine we have a spacecraft co-moving with one of the particles. The ceiling of the craft, the  direction, coincides with the  direction. The front of the craft is in the  direction, and the  direction is to the left of the craft. The spacecraft is small compared with the size of the orbit so that the local frame is a local Lorentz frame. In the local frame of the spacecraft the geodesic equation is given by

where

and

is the curvature tensor in the local frame.

Geodesic equation as a covariant derivative
The equation of motion for a particle in flat spacetime and in the absence of forces is

.

If we require a particle to travel along a geodesic in curved spacetime, then the analogous expression in curved spacetime is

where the derivative on the left is the covariant derivative, which is the generalization of the normal derivative to a derivative in curved spacetime. Here

is a Christoffel symbol.

The curvature is related to the Christoffel symbol by

.

Metric tensor in the local frame
The interval in the local frame is

where

 is the angle with the  axis (longitude) and

 is the angle with the  axis (latitude).

This gives a metric of

in the local frame.

The inverse of the metric tensor  is defined such that

where the term on the right is the Kronecker delta.

The transformation of the infinitesimal 4-volume  is

where g is the determinant of the metric tensor.

The differential of the determinant of the metric tensor is

.

The relationship between the Christoffel symbols and the metric tensor is

.

Principle of least action in general relativity

The principle of least action states that the world line between two events in spacetime is that world line that minimizes the action between the two events. In classical mechanics the principle of least action is used to derive Newton's laws of motion and is the basis for Lagrangian dynamics. In relativity it is expressed as

between events 1 and 2 is a minimum. Here S is a scalar and

is known as the Lagrangian density. The Lagrangian density is divided into two parts, the density for the orbiting particle  and the density  of the gravitational field generated by all other particles including those comprising the earth,

.

In curved spacetime, the "shortest" world line is that geodesic that minimizes the curvature along the geodesic. The action then is proportional to the curvature of the world line. Since S is a scalar, the scalar curvature is the appropriate measure of curvature. The action for the particle is therefore

where  is an unknown constant. This constant will be determined by requiring the theory to reduce to Newton's law of gravitation in the nonrelativistic limit.

The Lagrangian density for the particle is therefore

.

The action for the particle and the earth is

.

We find the world line that lies on the surface of the sphere of radius r by varying the metric tensor. Minimization and neglect of terms that disappear on the boundaries, including terms second order in the derivative of g, yields

where

is the Hilbert stress–energy tensor of the field generated by the earth.

The relationship, to within an unknown constant factor, between the stress-energy and the curvature is

.

Stress–energy tensor

Newton's law of gravitation

Newton's Law of Gravitation in non-relativistic mechanics states that the acceleration on an object of mass  due to another object of mass  is equal to

The time t is scaled with the speed of light c

.

For definiteness. consider a particle of mass  orbiting in the gravitational field of the earth with mass . The law of gravitation can be written

where  is the average mass density inside a sphere of radius .

Gravitational force in terms of the 00 component of the stress–energy tensor

Newton's law can be written

.

where  is the volume of a sphere of radius . The quantity  will be recognized from special relativity as the rest energy of the large body, the earth. This is the sum of the rest energies of all the particles that compose earth. The quantity in the parentheses is then the average rest energy density of a sphere of radius  about the earth. The gravitational field is proportional to the average energy density within a radius r. This is the 00 component of the stress–energy tensor in relativity for the special case in which all the energy is rest energy. More generally

where

There are N particles altogether making up the earth.

Relativistic generalization of the energy density

There are two simple relativistic entities that reduce to the 00 component of the stress–energy tensor in the nonrelativistic limit

and the trace

where  is the 4-velocity.

The 00 component of the stress–energy tensor can be generalized to the relativistic case as a linear combination of the two terms

where

4-acceleration due to gravity

The 4-acceleration due to gravity can be written

.

Since the magnitude of the 4-velocity is constant, it is only the component of the force perpendicular to the 4-velocity that contributes to the acceleration. We must therefore subtract off the component of force parallel to the 4-velocity. This is known as Fermi–Walker transport. In other words,

.

This yields

.

The force in the local frame is

.

Einstein field equation

We obtain the Einstein field equation by equating the acceleration required for circular orbits with the acceleration due to gravity

.

This is the relationship between curvature of spacetime and the stress–energy tensor.

The Ricci tensor becomes

.

The trace of the Ricci tensor is

.

Comparison of the Ricci tensor with the Ricci tensor calculated from the principle of least action, Theoretical motivation for general relativity#Principle of least action in general relativity identifying the stress–energy tensor with the Hilbert stress-energy, and remembering that A+B=1 removes the ambiguity in A, B, and C.

and

.

This gives

.

The field equation can be written

where

.

This is the Einstein field equation that describes curvature of spacetime that results from stress-energy density. This equation, along with the geodesic equation have been motivated by the kinetics and dynamics of a particle orbiting the earth in a circular orbit. They are true in general.

Solving the Einstein field equation

Solving the Einstein field equation requires an iterative process. The solution is represented in the metric tensor

.

Typically there is an initial guess for the tensor. The guess is used to calculate Christoffel symbols, which are used to calculate the curvature. If the Einstein field equation is not satisfied, the process is repeated.

Solutions occur in two forms, vacuum solutions and non-vacuum solutions. A vacuum solution is one in which the stress–energy tensor is zero. The relevant vacuum solution for circular orbits is the Schwarzschild metric. There are also a number of exact solutions that are non-vacuum solutions, solutions in which the stress tensor is non-zero.

Solving the geodesic equation

Solving the geodesic equations requires knowledge of the metric tensor obtained through the solution of the Einstein field equation. Either the Christoffel symbols or the curvature are calculated from the metric tensor. The geodesic equation is then integrated with the appropriate boundary conditions.

Electrodynamics in curved spacetime

Maxwell's equations, the equations of electrodynamics, in curved spacetime are a generalization of Maxwell's equations in flat spacetime (see Formulation of Maxwell's equations in special relativity). Curvature of spacetime affects electrodynamics. Maxwell's equations in curved spacetime can be obtained by replacing the derivatives in the equations in flat spacetime with covariant derivatives. The sourced and source-free equations become (cgs units):

,

and

where  is the 4-current,  is the field strength tensor,  is the Levi-Civita symbol, and

is the 4-gradient. Repeated indices are summed over according to Einstein summation convention. We have displayed the results in several common notations.

The first tensor equation is an expression of the two inhomogeneous Maxwell's equations, Gauss' law and the Ampère's law with Maxwell's correction.  The second equation is an expression of the homogeneous equations, Faraday's law of induction and Gauss's law for magnetism.

The electromagnetic wave equation is modified from the equation in flat spacetime in two ways, the derivative is replaced with the covariant derivative and a new term that depends on the curvature appears.

where the 4-potential is defined such that

.

We have assumed the generalization of the Lorenz gauge in curved spacetime

.

See also
 Newtonian motivations for general relativity

References

 
 

General relativity